John or Johnny Mullins may refer to:

 Johnny Mullins (born 1985), English footballer
 John Lane Mullins (1857–1939), Australian politician
 John Mullins (priest) (died 1591), English churchman and Marian exile
 Johnny Mullins (songwriter) (1923–2009), American country songwriter

See also 
 John Mullin (disambiguation)